Norio Matsubara (born 1968, Paraná) is a former Racing Driver. He is a  Brazilian of Japanese descent.

Titles and Competitions 

Brazilian Formula Ford champion in 1992.
Sudan Formula 3 frontrunner (6th) won Goiania race 1993.
Intercontinental Formula 3000 - Omegaland 1994.

References 

Living people
Brazilian racing drivers
Brazilian people of Japanese descent
1968 births
Sportspeople from Paraná (state)